"Bart's Inner Child" is the seventh episode of the fifth season of the American animated television series The Simpsons. It originally aired on the Fox network in the United States on November 11, 1993. In the episode, Marge — realizing her excessive nagging spoils the family's fun — seeks help from self-help guru Brad Goodman. He praises Bart's irreverent attitude and encourages his followers to emulate Bart's care-free antics. Soon everyone in Springfield starts to act like Bart, who feels that his role as a troublemaker is usurped. After the inaugural "Do What You Feel Festival" ends in calamity and a riot, the town decides to stop acting like Bart.

The episode was written by George Meyer and directed by Bob Anderson — his first time directing the show. Actor Albert Brooks guest stars in the episode as Brad Goodman, a self-help guru modelled after John Bradshaw. It was Brooks' third of ten appearances in the Simpsons franchise. Singer James Brown guest stars as himself; he sings his 1965 song "I Got You (I Feel Good)". In 2006, Brooks was named the best Simpsons guest star by IGN, while Brown's appearance has been described as "hilariously over-the-top".

The episode features cultural references to several films, television shows, and songs, including the 1939 film Gone with the Wind, Scott Joplin's piano rag "The Entertainer", and the Wile E. Coyote and Road Runner cartoons.

In its original broadcast, "Bart's Inner Child" finished 40th in the weekly ratings with a Nielsen rating of 11.8, and was viewed in 11.12 million households.

Plot
Krusty gives a free trampoline to Homer, who places it in the Simpsons' backyard. Bart and Lisa are thrilled, but Marge frets it may be dangerous. Homer ignores her fretting and charges neighbors a fee to use it. When scores of people are injured, Homer heeds Marge's advice to get rid of the trampoline. After several failed attempts to dispose of it, Bart suggests chaining it to a pole to tempt thieves with the challenge of stealing it. Soon Snake breaks the chain and takes it.

Although he agrees Marge was right about the trampoline, Homer argues that he is at least willing to go out and try new things while she is considered a bore who nags too much. When Bart and Lisa agree with Homer's assessment, Marge is angrier and visits Patty and Selma. They show her an infomercial featuring self-help guru Brad Goodman to help conquer her chronic nagging. After Marge and Homer watch a Brad Goodman video, they learn to express their frustrations with each other using self-help language and get along better.

The Simpsons attend a Brad Goodman lecture, hoping they will learn how to curb Bart's unruly behavior. When Bart interrupts the lecture, Brad Goodman, who acts more like a director than a psychiatrist, praises him as an example of a well-adjusted person and encourages the town to adopt Bart's irreverent and carefree attitude. Soon the whole town begins to act like Bart, doing whatever they please while ignoring the consequences. However, Bart becomes downhearted when he feels as if his reputation as a troublemaker has been usurped.

To celebrate their new-found attitude, the town holds a "Do What You Feel Festival". It goes awry because maintenance workers "didn't feel like" erecting the stage or installing amusement rides properly. A runaway Ferris wheel smashes the gates of a zoo, sending a stampede of wild animals through the streets. Soon a riot starts because everyone has learned to say whatever they are thinking, regardless of its effect on others. Blaming Bart for starting the whole "Do What You Feel" fiasco, a mob chases him. Using a parade float, Homer saves him. The town gives up the chase despite the float's slow speed. The Simpsons return home and conclude that everyone is fine the way they are.

Production
"Bart's Inner Child" was written by George Meyer and directed by Bob Anderson. It was Anderson's directorial debut on The Simpsons. Meyer's inspiration for the episode came from the fact that he was going through therapy at the time and he thought it would be a good idea "to send up these self-help gurus".

Actor Albert Brooks guest starred in the episode as Brad Goodman. It was Brooks' third appearance on the show after playing Jacques in "Life on the Fast Lane" and Cowboy Bob in "The Call of the Simpsons". He would later guest star as Hank Scorpio in "You Only Move Twice", Tab Spangler in "The Heartbroke Kid", and Russ Cargill in The Simpsons Movie. Executive producer David Mirkin describes Brooks as "really weird to direct" because "almost every one of his takes is flawless, but each one has different material. He makes up the stuff as he goes." He uses a combination of the jokes in the script and his own material and because many of his takes are different, it is difficult for the producers to decide which lines to use. Goodman was based on the American self-help author John Bradshaw, who popularized such psychological ideas as the "wounded inner child" and the dysfunctional family.

Singer James Brown guest stars as himself. Brown makes an appearance at the "Do What You Feel" festival, during which he sings his 1965 song "I Got You (I Feel Good)". After a bandstand collapses, he proclaims "Hey, wait a minute, hold on here! This bandstand wasn't double-bolted!" He described the experience as "good, clean, and humorous. And we need more of that around." According to Mirkin, the writers like to give guest stars awkward lines that then sound funny coming from them. They knew Brown would not be "the greatest actor in the world" but still "gave him these incredibly hilarious, stiff lines that killed." Mirkin described Brown's line as "horrible" but because of Brown's reading, "you have something that just sounds perfectly wrong and it makes it funny." In his book Planet Simpson, Chris Turner describes James Brown's performance as "hilariously over-the-top" and uses it as an example of how the early seasons of the show would include celebrity cameos and not point out the "enormity of their fame".

Cultural references
The episode features cultural references to several films, television shows, and songs. The scene with a field full of injured children from the trampoline is a reference to the field of injured soldiers shot in the film Gone with the Wind. There is a sequence of Homer trying to push the trampoline off of a cliff, but once he pushes it over the edge, it lands on a pillar of rock and bounces back up. This is a reference to the Chuck Jones-directed Wile E. Coyote and Road Runner Looney Tunes cartoons. The background imitates the desert landscape from the cartoons. At church, Reverend Lovejoy attempts to play the classic rag "The Entertainer" by Scott Joplin on the organ.

Reception

Critical reception
In 2006, Albert Brooks was named the best Simpsons guest star by IGN, who said he "captivate[s] the audience with his unique characters".

In Planet Simpson, Chris Turner also praised Brooks' performance, writing that "Brooks went for a subtle, slow-burn lampoon rather than broad caricature: his Goodman doesn't ooze insincerity, he just lightly dribbles it. [...] Through a dozen little touches, Brooks created a timeless Simpsons character." Turner described the Wile E. Coyote and Road Runner homage as "one of the show's most overt and inspired tributes to the Warner cartoons."

Today'''s Patrick Enwright listed the episode as his ninth favorite in the show in 2007, saying it "brilliantly skewers new-agey self-help gurus" and adding that "it's also noteworthy for clever pop-cultural references."

The authors of the book I Can't Believe It's a Bigger and Better Updated Unofficial Simpsons Guide'', Warren Martyn and Adrian Wood, described it as "A very bizarre episode in which everyone just has a good time."

DVD Movie Guide's Colin Jacobson wrote: "A certified classic, 'Child' mocks the self-help field and makes a good point along the way. Of course, it does all this with scads of clever moments and becomes a great show. As one who works in psychology, it's hard to resist this program's spoofery."

Patrick Bromley of DVD Verdict gave the episode a grade of B+ and described Homer's escapades with the trampoline as "the episode's brightest spot."

Bill Gibron of DVD Talk gave the episode a score of 4.5 out of 5.

Ratings
In its original broadcast, "Bart's Inner Child" finished 40th in the weekly ratings during the week of November 8–14, 1993 with a Nielsen rating of 11.8, and was viewed in 11.12 million households. It was the highest-rated show on Fox that week.

References

Bibliography

External links

The Simpsons (season 5) episodes
1993 American television episodes
James Brown
Cultural depictions of James Brown